The Jay Gould House was a mansion located at 857 Fifth Avenue at East 67th Street, on the Upper East Side of Manhattan, New York City.

History 
The home was constructed in the French Neo-Gothic style for financier Jay Gould, who later gave it to his eldest son, George Jay Gould. The younger Gould tore down the mansion in 1906, and he had the George J. Gould House built in its place.

References 
Notes

Bibliography
 Greg King. The Court of Mrs. Astor In Gilded Age New York. Wiley, 2008.

External links 
 

Fifth Avenue
Upper East Side
Gould family residences
1906 disestablishments in New York (state)
Buildings and structures demolished in 1906
Demolished buildings and structures in Manhattan